Gyan Singh is a former Fijian politician of Indian descent, who held the Magodro Open Constituency in the House of Representatives for the Fiji Labour Party in the parliamentary election of 2001, taking almost 57 percent of the votes cast. He retained the seat at the 2006 election with an increased majority.

Singh's career came to an end with the military coup of 5 December 2006.

References

Fiji Labour Party politicians
Indian members of the House of Representatives (Fiji)
Living people
Politicians from Ba Province
Fijian politicians of Indian descent
Year of birth missing (living people)